Obskoye is a rural locality (a selo) in Gonokhovsky Selsoviet, Kamensky District, Altai Krai, Russia. The population was 296 as of 2013. There are 8 streets.

Geography 
Obskoye is located 39 km southeast of Kamen-na-Obi (the district's administrative centre) by road. Gonokhovo is the nearest rural locality.

References 

Rural localities in Kamensky District, Altai Krai